Gypsy Peak is a  high mountain in the Salmo-Priest Wilderness in the Selkirk Mountains of Pend Oreille County, Washington. It is the highest mountain in Eastern Washington.

References

External links

Mountains of Washington (state)
Mountains of Pend Oreille County, Washington